Paintbrush Canyon is located in Grand Teton National Park, in the U. S. state of Wyoming. The canyon was formed by glaciers which retreated at the end of the last glacial maximum approximately 15,000 years ago. The canyon lies between Rockchuck Peak and Mount Saint John to the south and Mount Woodring to the north. Leigh Lake is at the base of the canyon to the east and the alpine Holly Lake is located mid canyon. Views from Paintbrush Divide include Lake Solitude (which is also passed on the circuit hike) and of Mount Moran to the north and the Cathedral Group including Grand Teton to the south. An ice axe may be necessary for hikes in the early summer.

See also
Canyons of the Teton Range
Geology of the Grand Teton area

References

Canyons and gorges of Grand Teton National Park